Ameny was an ancient Egyptian official of the 13th Dynasty with the title high steward. In this function he was the main administrator of the royal estates.

Attestation
Ameny is known from several stelae, a statue and from scarabs. Ameny's father was a certain Tahaa and his mother the lady of the house Kemtet. Not much is known about them.

High Steward
As high steward,Ameny was, after the visier and treasurer, the most important official at the royal court. On some of his monuments, he appears with important ranking titles, such as member of the elite, foremost of action and royal sealer. On one stela in a private collection, he appears next to the treasurer Senebsumai. The latter is well datable into the middle of the 13th Dynasty also providing a fixpoint for the date of Ameny.

References 

Officials of the Thirteenth Dynasty of Egypt
Ancient Egyptian high stewards